The Coagh ambush was a military confrontation that took place in County Tyrone, Northern Ireland, on 3 June 1991, during The Troubles, when a Provisional Irish Republican Army (IRA) active service unit from its East Tyrone Brigade was ambushed by the British Army's Special Air Service (SAS) at the village of Coagh, in County Tyrone, whilst on its way to kill a part-time member of the Ulster Defence Regiment (UDR). The ambush resulted in the deaths of all three IRA men involved.

Background
In May 1987, an eight-man unit of the Provisional IRA East Tyrone Brigade was ambushed and shot dead by the Special Air Service (SAS) during an attack by them on a Royal Ulster Constabulary (RUC) rural police station at the village of Loughgall, County Armagh. This was the IRA's greatest loss of life in a single incident during its campaign. Despite this major setback, IRA activity in East Tyrone didn't lessen in the following years.

In August 1988, the British Army shot dead another three IRA men who were stalking a part-time Ulster Defence Regiment soldier whilst he was off-duty near Carrickmore. British intelligence sources claimed the men were involved in the Ballygawley bus bombing, which killed eight British soldiers and injured 28, which resulted in the British Army changing its troop transportation methods in East Tyrone, switching from using unarmoured vehicular transport coaches on country roads, to ferrying them in and out of its bases in the district using helicopters.

Tit-for-tat killings in East Tyrone
The series of killings which led to the Coagh ambush began on 26 April 1988, when a 23-year-old UDR soldier from Coagh, Edward Gibson, was shot dead by an IRA unit at Ardboe whilst at work for Cookstown Council on a bin lorry. Off-duty UDR soldiers, who tended to be Protestants, were common targets of the IRA in County Tyrone. These attacks fostered a perception among some in the Protestant community that the IRA was waging an ethnic war against them. The Ulster Volunteer Force (UVF) retaliated by killing Phelim McNally (brother of local Sinn Féin councillor Francie McNally) on 24 November 1988. This was followed by an IRA attack upon a car maintenance garage business owned by retired UDR soldier Leslie Dallas on 7 March 1989, in which Dallas, along with two civilian pensioners that were attending the premises at the time of the attack, were all murdered by machine-gun fire from a passing vehicle, the IRA attackers driving off afterwards cheering as reported by eye-witnesses in the vicinity.
The IRA, announcing responsibility for the attack afterwards stated that Dallas was a member of the Ulster Volunteer Force. A subsequent RUC and coroner's inquest found that Dallas had no discernible links with the UVF; and local residents later stated that he had been targeted on the basis of his former service with the British Army, and the fact of his being a prominent member of the Orange Order in the town. In contrast, journalist Ed Moloney described Dallas as a UVF member and "leading member of one of the four UVF families in the East Tyrone-South Derry area." In 1977 Dallas and two other men, already on remand for a charge of intimidation linked to the loyalist strike the previous May, were charged with carrying a shotgun with intent to commit intimidation.

The tit-for-tat campaign around Coagh continued on 29 November 1989, when UVF gunmen attacked a pub owned by IRA member Liam Ryan, shooting Ryan dead; a patron at the premises was also killed in the incident. On 8 March 1990, part-time UDR soldier and construction worker Thomas Jamison was killed by the IRA in a gun and grenade ambush attack on a concrete mixer lorry he was driving near Donaghmore, whilst delivering concrete to a British Army base. Jamison was an employee of 'Henry Brothers', a building firm that had a contract with the British Government for constructing police and armed forces' installations. Harold Henry, one of the two brothers who owned the company, had been murdered by the IRA in 1987 in The Loup, County Londonderry.

On 3 March 1991, the Ulster Volunteer Force carried out an attack at the village of Cappagh, killing three IRA members. The IRA subsequently stated its belief that this attack could have been carried out only with the connivance of the British state forces.

On 9 April 1991, the IRA's East Tyrone Brigade shot dead Derek Ferguson in Coagh (a cousin of local Member of Parliament Reverend William McCrea), stating afterward that he was a paramilitary with the Ulster Volunteer Force. Ferguson's family subsequently refuted that he had anything to do with Loyalist paramilitarism.

Historian Kevin Toolis includes as part of this cycle of violence the destruction of Glenanne UDR barracks in nearby County Armagh, in which three soldiers were killed and 10 injured by an IRA truck bomb on 30 May. The IRA later claimed the killings of three of its members that followed in Coagh was a retaliation by the British Army for the Glenanne bombing.

The ambush

At 7.30 am on 3 June 1991, three Tyrone IRA paramilitaries – Tony Doris (21 years old), Michael "Pete" Ryan (37) (on the run at the time from the Royal Ulster Constabulary since 1981 after escaping from imprisonment in Belfast for terrorist related offences) and Lawrence McNally (39) – drove a stolen Vauxhall Cavalier from Moneymore, County Londonderry to the village of Coagh, crossing the border of counties Londonderry and Tyrone, to kill a part-time Ulster Defence Regiment soldier, who was in his civilian life a contractor that worked with the security forces. According to Toolis, the IRA believed the soldier was also an associate of the UVF and he was "notoriously hated and feared" by the local Nationalist community because of threats issued to Catholic at road checkpoints. Their intent, however, was known to the British security forces, having been revealed by either a Crown agent within the IRA itself, or from covert technical surveillance. In consequence a detachment from the British Army's Special Air Service was lying in wait for Doris, Ryan and McNally on both sides of Coagh's main street, and also in a red Bedford lorry at the scene.

The stolen car was driven by Doris towards the centre of the village, its journey from Moneymore being tracked on the ground and in the air. At the scene of the ambush the British Army had set up a "decoy" target for the IRA to go for in the form of an SAS trooper who was pretending to be their intended victim, sitting in his car at a regular spot while waiting to pick up a friend on their way to work, which IRA intelligence had established the behavioral pattern of. When the stolen car carrying the IRA men approached the scene the Special Air Service detachment opened sustained automatic fire upon it from close range. Doris was immediately hit, and the out-of-control car crashed into two nearby parked cars. The shooting continued until the car exploded in flames and set one of the parked vehicles it had crashed into alight. According to an eyewitness, one of the IRA men in the car returned fire from within the vehicle after the crash. Some reports claim at least two of the IRA men attempted to exit the crashed car and were subsequently found lying half out of its doors by the later police investigation of the scene. Relatives of the IRA men subsequently stated that they had received information from the scene that two of the IRA attackers had fled on foot from the car after the crash, but had been pursued after and shot down by the British Army in the vicinity, with their bodies being taken back to the car, which was subsequently reported to be riddled with over 200 bullet holes. A Royal Ulster Constabulary crime-scene report stated that a balaclava belonging to one of the IRA men was found some distance away from the vehicle.

The bodies of Doris, Ryan and McNally were badly burnt by the car fire, and had to be identified by police using their dental records. Two rifles were recovered from within the burnt-out stolen car, subsequent police forensic examination of them revealing that they had both been used in the multiple murders at Leslie Dallas's garage (see above) in March 1989.

Subsequent events
Local Democratic Unionist Party (DUP) politician William McCrea – cousin of Derek Ferguson, killed by the IRA on 9 April – declared that "(the IRA men involved) had fallen into the pit they planned for others.... Justice has now been done". Ian Paisley, leader of the DUP, welcomed the ambush and said "The time has come for a full war". Sinn Féin councillor Francie McNally – brother of Lawrence McNally – said the three men were "good soldiers ... executed by the British Crown forces". Sinn Féin criticised both the RUC and Gardaí for "delaying and harassing" the subsequent funerals of the three men, whose bodies were buried with IRA ceremony. Sinn Féin publicly denied RUC statements that the unit Doris, Ryan and McNally were a part of was engaged in an ethnic-sectarian campaign targeting Protestant workmen. Social Democratic and Labour Party MP Seamus Mallon warned that an "ethic of violence is eating into the soul of this community" and that he "hoped that every effort at arrest had been made".

See also
Clonoe ambush
1992 Coalisland riots
1993 Fivemiletown ambush
1997 Coalisland attack
Chronology of Provisional Irish Republican Army actions (1990–1991)
Provisional IRA East Tyrone Brigade
The Troubles in Coagh

Notes

References
 Toolis, Kevin (1995). Rebel Hearts: journeys within the IRA's soul. Picador; 

The Troubles in County Tyrone
Provisional Irish Republican Army actions
Deaths by firearm in Northern Ireland
People killed by security forces during The Troubles (Northern Ireland)
Operations involving British special forces
Special Air Service
1991 in Northern Ireland
Conflicts in 1991
Military history of County Tyrone
British Army in Operation Banner
Military actions and engagements during the Troubles (Northern Ireland)
20th century in County Tyrone
June 1991 events in the United Kingdom
Ambushes in Northern Ireland